The 1984–85 Marquette Warriors men's basketball team represented Marquette University during the 1984–85 college basketball season.

Schedule

|-
!colspan=9 style=| NIT

References 

Marquette
Marquette Golden Eagles men's basketball seasons
Marquette Warriors men's basketball
Marquette Warriors men's basketball